Schmiedeknechtia is a genus of bees belonging to the family Apidae.

Species:

Schmiedeknechtia brevicornis 
Schmiedeknechtia gussakovskyi 
Schmiedeknechtia oraniensis 
Schmiedeknechtia piliventris 
Schmiedeknechtia verhoeffi 
Schmiedeknechtia walteri

References

Apidae